The Watkins 32 is an American sailboat that was designed by William H. Tripp Jr as a cruiser and first built in 1982.

The design was derived from the molds used for the Columbia 32.

Production
The design was built by Watkins Yachts in the United States, commencing in 1982. The company completed eight examples of the design before shifting production to a modified version, the Watkins 33 in 1984.

Design
The Watkins 32 is a recreational keelboat, built predominantly of fiberglass, with wood trim. It has a masthead sloop rig, a raked stem, an angled transom, a skeg-mounted  rudder controlled by a tiller and a fixed fin keel. It displaces  and carries  of ballast.

The boat is fitted with a Japanese Yanmar diesel engine of either .

The galley is to starboard and can be fitted with a two-burner alcohol or propane-fire stove, plus a refrigerator. The head and a hanging locker are forward, just aft of the forepeak V-berth. A port-side dinette table, that converts to a double berth and a quarter berth are in the main cabin, with the navigation station to port. The interior doors are all made from louvered teak.

Ventilation is provided by six opening ports, plus a forward hatch over the V-berth.

An anchor locker is fitted in the bow. The halyards and outhaul are all internally-led, with halyard winches being a factory-option. The boat is equipped with a topping lift, internal jiffy reefing and has two jib sheet winches.

Operational history
The boat is supported by an active class club, the Watkins Owners.

In a review Richard Sherwood wrote, "while the freeboard is high, the cabin is kept low to reduce windage. Both the keel and the rudder are medium in depth, and with a draft of four feet, the Watkins can be used for gunkholing."

See also
List of sailing boat types

Related development
Watkins 33

Similar sailboats
Aloha 32
Bayfield 30/32
Beneteau 323
C&C 32
Contest 32 CS
Douglas 32
Hunter 32 Vision
Hunter 326
Mirage 32
Morgan 32
Ontario 32
Nonsuch 324
Ranger 32

References

Keelboats
1980s sailboat type designs
Sailing yachts
Sailboat type designs by William H. Tripp Jr.
Sailboat types built by Watkins Yachts